Ángel González may refer to:

 Ángel Gaud González (born 1930), Puerto Rican scientist
 Ángel González Muñiz (1925–2008), Spanish poet
 Angel González Román, Puerto Rican jurist
 Luis Ángel González Macchi (born 1947), President of Paraguay
 Remigio Ángel González (born 1944), Mexican media mogul
 Ángel González, Spanish composer; see Basúchil
 Ángel González (Argentine footballer) (born 1994), Argentine midfielder for Estudiantes
 Ángel González (Paraguayan footballer) (born 2003), Paraguayan goalkeeper for Porto B
 Ángel González (Spanish footballer) (born 1958), Spanish forward for CD Logroñés
 Ángel González (Venezuelan footballer) (born 1994), Venezuelan forward for Monagas Sport Club
 Ángel Martín González (born 1964), Spanish retired footballer

See also
 Miguel Ángel González (disambiguation)